Nassarius dekkeri is a species of sea snail, a marine gastropod mollusc in the family Nassariidae, the Nassa mud snails or dog whelks.

Description
The shell grows to a length of 10 mm.

Distribution
This species occurs in the Red Sea.

References

External links
 

Nassariidae
Gastropods described in 2001